Rio Grande Valley Ocelots FC were an American soccer team based in Brownsville, Texas, United States. Ocelots FC was founded in 2010 and competed in the Southern Premier Soccer League's single 2010–11 season of existence. The team played its home games at Brownsville Sports Park.

History
Source:

In 2009, the Rio Grande Valley Bravos FC were successful in breaking into the United Soccer League-to bring the first professional soccer franchise to the Valley-an accomplishment which Sitsanthaparn spoke highly of and even prompted him to personally congratulate the then Bravos FC staff.

Amidst the inevitability of Bravos FC folding after only one season in the PDL, and given his previous experience with RGV Coyotes Soccer Club, Kru Kayan Sitsanthaparn, now Founder and Chairman of the Muay Thai Alliance of Texas (MTAT) was contacted by the few remaining Bravos FC staff members in an effort to find investors to keep the PDL franchise in operation.

Not able to find investors that would be willing to undertake the Bravos endeavor, Sitsanthaparn agreed to move forward with the project, and in March 2010, almost twelve years to the date of the Coyotes' first match, Sitsanthaparn acquired the franchise rights to RGV Bravos FC of the USL's Premier Development League   With the same enthusiasm, attitude, and philosophy that was successful during the "Coyote" days, the team was moved to Brownsville, a city teeming with soccer talent and fanaticism, yet neglected by other sports franchises. The squad played its last season as the Bravos at Brownsville Sports Park.

On October 13, 2010, the Bravos FC brand, colors, and logo were altogether abandoned to allow for the development of a completely new franchise, with a strong philosophy and identity that reflected the Coyotes' tedious efforts and accomplishments.  Coming full circle with a project that began more than a decade ago, the Ocelots adopted the original colors of the 1998-2004 RGV Coyotes Soccer Club (Orange, Black, White, and Silver).  The franchise adopted its mascot, the Texas Ocelot (an endangered species native to the area) and have the support of the United States Fish and Wildlife Service.
Team Owner Kru Kayan Sitsanthaparn currently sits on the Board of Directors for the Friends of the Laguna Atascosa National Wildlife Refuge. The refuge is known for being the last habitat in the United States in which the dwindling species lives. By agreement, partial proceeds from all Ocelots FC ticket sales at the gate benefit the Ocelot Adoption Program and Ocelot Foundation.

The Southern Premier Soccer League accepted the team's letter of intent to join the league for the 2011-2012 season.

In December 2010, the Ocelots announced FBT(Football Thai Ltd.) as its official uniform supplier and its affiliation agreement with FC New York (USL Pro).

Championship
On September 10, 2011, Rio Grande Valley Ocelots FC defeated defending SPSL champions Houston Regals SCA 2-1 at Fairgrounds Field in Robstown, Texas.  Ocelots FC now joins the RGV Vipers (basketball), RGV Whitewings (baseball), and Edinburg Roadrunners (baseball) in Valley Sports History to become the first minor league soccer franchise to win a championship for the region.  Ocelots FC further has the unique distinction of winning the League title in its inaugural year.

National Premier Soccer League
On October 11, 2011, two days shy of the anniversary of the founding of the club, Ocelots FC Owner Kru Kayan Sitsanthaparn announced the club's acceptance into the National Premier Soccer League (NPSL) as an expansion franchise in Texas for play in 2012.  For purposes of development and future interests, the Ocelots would have continued competing in the Southern Premier Soccer League with reserve and Under-20 players on its roster, while players on the 2011 Championship roster would have competed in the NPSL.

Corporate Sponsors
The Ocelots were sponsored by Glazer's Distributors/MillerCoors with Coors Light as the "Official Beer." 7UP/RC Cola Distributors is also a sponsor with Sun Drop Citrus Soda as the "Official Soft Drink." The Brownsville Herald and El Nuevo Heraldo (parent company: Freedom Newspapers) were official media partners.

Players

2011 roster

Honors
 2011 SPSL "Stars and Stripes" Cup Winners
 2011 SPSL Champions

Player Honors
 Abdiel Amador, SPSL Scoring Champion
 Ricky Rodriguez, SPSL Scoring Runner-Up

Head coaches
  Juan Macias (2010–present)

Stadia
 Brownsville Sports Park; Brownsville, Texas (2010–present)

References

External links

RGV Ocelots Official Site
Official SPSL site

Soccer clubs in Texas
Association football clubs established in 2010
Sports in the Rio Grande Valley
2010 establishments in Texas